Southend United Football Club is a professional association football club based in Southend-on-Sea, Essex, England. As of the 2022–23 season, the team competes in the National League, the fifth tier of English football. Southend are known as "The Shrimpers", a reference to the area's maritime industry included as one of the quarters on the club badge. The club is owned by property developer Ron Martin.

Founded on 19 May 1906 in the Blue Boar pub, Southend won the Southern League Second Division in both of their two initial seasons and were admitted into the Football League in 1920. They spent the next 44 years in the third tier of English football, before dropping into the Fourth Division in 1966. They spent the next 24 years moving between the third and fourth tiers, winning promotions in 1971–72, 1977–78, 1980–81 (as champions), 1986–87 and 1989–90. They were promoted into the Second Division for the first time at the end of the 1990–91 season. After six seasons in the second tier they suffered a double relegation in 1997 and 1998. Under the stewardship of Steve Tilson, Southend again secured a double promotion in 2004–05 and 2005–06 to win a place in the Championship as League One champions. However this time they only lasted one season in the second tier and were relegated back to League Two in 2010. They secured promotion as play-off winners in 2015, but suffered two successive relegations in 2020 and 2021, amidst financial problems, to drop - after 101 years in the Football League - into the National League, where they remain.

The club is based at Roots Hall Stadium in Prittlewell, but since 1998 (when Martin took ownership) has been planning to move to a new stadium at Fossetts Farm. Southend have a long-standing rivalry with nearby club Colchester United, with whom they contest the Essex derby.

History

1906–1984
Founded on 19 May 1906 in the Blue Boar pub, Southend United F.C. played in the Southern League until 1920, when they co-founded the Football League's new Third Division; they finished 17th in their first ever season. In 1921, the Third Division was regionalised with Southend United joining the southern section and here they remained until league re-structure in 1958. Southend came close to promotion twice when they finished 3rd in 1932 and 1950, the club's highest league positions until 1991.

Southend United joined the new national Third Division in 1958, where they remained until 1966 when they suffered their first ever relegation, into the Fourth Division. The club had to wait six seasons until 1972 to experience the club's first ever promotion as runners-up behind Grimsby Town. In 1976 Southend suffered relegation again before taking another runners-up spot behind Watford in 1978. Another relegation in 1980 was directly followed by one of the most successful seasons in the club's history as they won the Fourth Division Championship in 1981, breaking a series of club records in the process. Despite success on the pitch and low admission prices, the club's gates were low and condemned as "a bad reflection on the town".

1984–2004
In 1984, the club was relegated to the Fourth Division (Bobby Moore was manager), and the following season finished 20th, narrowly avoiding having to seek re-election to the Football League. However, Southend gained promotion in 1987. Although relegated again in 1989 (albeit with the highest point total of any relegated team in League history), successive promotions in 1990 and 1991 saw Southend United reach the second tier of the Football League; in 1992, under manager David Webb, the club finished 12th in the old Second Division, having briefly topped the division on New Year's Day, 1992.

Southend United were managed by Colin Murphy, Barry Fry and then Peter Taylor over the next three seasons. In 1995, former Liverpool player Ronnie Whelan became player-manager. Southend finished 14th in Division One in his first season as a manager, but were relegated a year later and Whelan left the club, later winning a case for wrongful dismissal. He was replaced by Alvin Martin but Martin was unable to avoid a second consecutive relegation. Martin left in April 1999, with Southend fifth from bottom in the Football League,. Alan Little was manager for a brief spell before the club turned again to David Webb, then Rob Newman, Steve Wignall and, in late 2003, former Southend United midfielder Steve Tilson.

2004–2010
Under Tilson, Southend reached their first national cup final, meeting Blackpool in the final of the Football League Trophy at the Millennium Stadium in Cardiff. Over 20,000 Southend fans travelled, but the team did not rise to the occasion and Blackpool won 2–0. Tilson then led Southend to promotion to League 1 in 2005, while making a second successive appearance in the Football League Trophy final, which the Shrimpers lost 2–0 to Wrexham, but the third appearance at the Millennium Stadium in the League Two play-off final against Lincoln City brought success giving the club its first promotion via the play-off system and their first major silverware since 1981.

In May 2006 Southend became League One champions after beating Bristol City 1–0 at Roots Hall in front of over 11,000 fans - the club's first title in 25 years. Tilson was named as the League Manager Association's Manager-of-the-Season for League One.

Southend started the 2006–07 season with wins over Stoke City and Sunderland, but then did not win a league game for 18 games until December 2006. In the meantime, however, Southend did beat trophy holders and Premier League Champions Manchester United 1–0 in a League Cup fourth round tie on 7 November 2006, with Freddy Eastwood scoring the winner. Southend briefly escaped the relegation zone in March 2007 but only 10 league wins in the season meant the Shrimpers were relegated back to League One. Southend finished sixth in League One at the end of 2007–08, qualifying for a play-off place. Against Doncaster Rovers, Southend drew the home leg 0–0, but lost the second leg 5–1. The following season, Southend finished 8th, missing out on a play-off place, but the 2009–2010 season was tougher: a run of just one win in 2010 left Southend deep in trouble, and relegation to League Two was confirmed on 24 April 2010 following a 2–2 draw at Oldham. On 4 July 2010 manager Steve Tilson was put on gardening leave,  ending his seven-year stint as manager.

2009–10 financial difficulties
During the 2009–10 season, Southend faced two winding-up orders from HM Revenue and Customs over unpaid tax bills. In February 2010 Southend players were not paid, the Professional Footballers Association had to pay the players, and the club were placed under a transfer embargo until they paid the money back. In March 2010 Southend were given a 35-day extension to pay the unpaid bill or face administration, and further seven day extension in April 2010. On 20 April 2010 the bill was paid, and in August 2010 all actions against Southend United were dropped and an agreement was reached with HMRC.

2011–2019
On 5 July 2010 former Sheffield Wednesday and Plymouth Argyle manager, Paul Sturrock was announced as the new manager. Sturrock led Southend to a 13th place in his first season, but the club mounted a more serious challenge the following season, spending 11 weeks at the top of League Two before a decline in form meant the team had to enter the play-offs. Southend lost the play off semi-final against Crewe Alexandra 3–2 on aggregate.

A transfer embargo at the start of the 2012–13 season saw the club start its campaign with a depleted squad. However, a successful loan signing - Britt Assombalonga from Watford - helped Southend to a run of 14 games unbeaten which saw them reach 4th in the table. League form dipped in early 2013, but the club reached its first Wembley cup final in the Football League Trophy. Paul Sturrock was sacked two weeks before the cup final but was controversially asked to manage the team for the final. Sturrock refused and watched the game from the stand. The Blues took a record 33,000 fans to the match, but lost 2–0 to Crewe Alexandra.

Phil Brown was brought in as Sturrock's successor but picked up just one win in his eight games in charge as Southend finished the season in 11th position, with only six league wins at Roots Hall all season. In 2015 Brown led the team, via a play-off final against Wycombe Wanderers (decided 7–6 on penalties), into League One. At the end of the 2016–2017 season, the club missed the play-offs for the Championship by only one point. The following season, Southend finished 10th, but slipped to 19th at the end of the 2018–2019 season, avoiding relegation on goal difference having finished equal on 50 points with relegated Plymouth Argyle.

2019–present
On 22 October 2019, Sol Campbell was appointed manager of Southend. Campbell took charge for his first game — a 3–1 home defeat to Ipswich Town — on 25 October.

Financial difficulties
Financial difficulties, including a winding-up petition heard on 22 January 2020, resulted in non-payment of players' and other employees' wages in December 2019, after which players consulted with the PFA. At this point (9 January 2020), Southend were 22nd in League One, 15 points from safety after winning only one of 24 league games. Club chairman Ron Martin paid £140,000 after seven senior Southend United players were not paid their December 2019 wages on time, and met with all players to reassure them it would not happen again. The winding-up petition was dismissed after debts were cleared.

On 18 January 2020, Southend won their first league game under Campbell with a 2–1 victory away at Accrington Stanley, also a first league win since 21 September 2019. However, financial constraints prevented the club signing any new players during the January 2020 transfer window. On 2 March, Martin confirmed Southend was under an EFL transfer embargo due to an unpaid tax bill, while February's wages to players were not paid on time, resulting in further PFA involvement. On 9 March, Southend was charged with misconduct by the EFL for failing to pay players on time, and for fielding an ineligible player against Lincoln City on 1 February (on 2 June, Southend received a suspended three-point penalty and were fined £7,500 for these offences). On 11 March, a further HMRC winding-up petition was adjourned to 29 April; it was then adjourned three more times, eventually to 28 October 2020.

Double relegation
On 2 April 2020, during the COVID-19 pandemic in the United Kingdom, Southend put "several staff and some players" on furlough (temporary leave) under the UK Government's emergency job retention scheme. The club's chairman said "It enables the club to best manage its finances during this time of limited income", but the move was criticised by the PFA who said the club had "consistently" let players down over wages. On 9 June, Football League clubs in Leagues One and Two agreed to end the 2019–20 season; Southend were relegated to League Two. The following day, the club announced it was putting the whole playing squad on furlough, but players refused to accept the move. On 30 June 2020, manager Campbell and three assistants left the club by mutual consent.

On 13 August 2020, Southend United appointed Mark Molesley, formerly manager of Weymouth, as their new manager on a three-year contract. On 28 October 2020, the club finally settled tax debts of £493,931 with HMRC; as a result, a winding-up petition was dismissed by the High Court. On 9 April 2021, Molesley was sacked having only won eight games out of 45; the club were 23rd, five points from safety with six games remaining. Phil Brown returned as manager but could not rescue the situation; Southend suffered a second successive relegation on 1 May 2021 with a game to spare despite a 2–1 victory at Barrow, dropping out of the Football League after 101 years. Brown subsequently agreed a two-year contract to manage the club.

In April 2021, former Southend player Stan Collymore wrote to Martin offering to buy the club from him, and held talks concerning the potential appointment of a Collymore associate as the club's CEO. In May 2021, Tom Lawrence (formerly CEO at Gillingham) was appointed. In August 2021, Southend revealed their overall debt in July 2019 was £17.4m, having grown by £2.4m; Martin said the majority of the debt was owed to his companies, and that £6.8m of debt had already been written off. On 21 August 2021, Southend started their first season in the National League with a 1–0 victory at King's Lynn Town, but a six-match winless streak had manager Phil Brown fearing for his future, describing Southend as stuck in a massive "chasm". On 5 and 9 October 2021, Southend fans staged protests at Roots Hall demanding the departure of chairman Ron Martin; following a 4–0 defeat by Chesterfield at Roots Hall on 9 October, Brown was sacked. Collymore offered further free support to the club, described by the BBC as "a mess" and "already on life support". Defender Jason Demetriou took temporary charge before, on 20 October 2021, Kevin Maher returned to the club as head coach, supported by assistant Darren Currie and Mark Bentley as first team coach. CEO Tom Lawrence also started negotiations with Collymore about a formal role with the club, and he was appointed the club's senior football strategist in early November 2021, with John Still appointed head of football two weeks later. In December 2021, Southend was placed under a National League embargo because of HMRC debts caused by the COVID-19 pandemic; after back-to-back relegations and 18 months of reduced income, CEO Lawrence said the club was "in a deteriorating income position". In May 2022, Southend finished their first National League season in 13th position.

Further financial difficulties
On 30 September 2022, the club was placed under a transfer embargo after a missed payment to HMRC. In a statement, Martin blamed a programme delay for a missed payment under the club's Time To Pay Agreement with HMRC, which he said had been cancelled prematurely. He said bridging finance would enable the club to discharge its HMRC debt in full. Nonetheless, in October 2022, HMRC issued a winding-up petition. Due to be heard at the High Court on 9 November, it was adjourned to 18 January 2023; the transfer embargo remained in place. After members of staff were reported to be late receiving their October 2022 salaries, the Shrimpers Trust and shirt sponsor PG Site Services each loaned the club £40,000, a gesture described by CEO Tom Lawrence as "humbling". November and some December 2022 wages for players and non-playing staff were also paid late (on 29 December 2022, many backroom staff remained unpaid since October). Lawrence said the club had a funding gap of about £2m a year; promotion to League Two would reduce current losses to more manageable levels; the club was then 6th in the National League.

With the club's final accounts for the year to 31 July 2020 still not filed (overdue since April 2021), on 3 January 2023, Companies House issued a first Gazette notice to have the company struck off. On 18 January 2023, the HMRC winding up hearing was adjourned again, until 1 March 2023. In a 25 January 2023 statement, Martin could not "outline precise timings" regarding the bridging finance; he was later reported to be seeking a £5m loan to pay debts including £1.4m in unpaid tax owed to HMRC. The Shrimpers Trust did not expect the club to make a loan repayment due at the start of February, and, with players and other staff unpaid for January, anxious fans started planning a 'phoenix club' and there were unsuccessful attempts to engage with Martin over a possible sale of the club.

On 10 February 2023, St John Ambulance said it would no longer provide first aid staff at Southend United home games because of outstanding fees, forcing the club to find alternative medical cover ahead of an FA Trophy tie with York City. The following day, Martin said finding the money to clear the club's HMRC debt by 1 March "will be close" but he "will not let the club be wound-up". He described the debt as a legacy of unpaid PAYE for players' wages from when Southend was in Leagues One and Two. Martin said: "Raising the funds is my primary focus. We are advanced but not there yet. Times are tough but I'm not a magician. However, if we get past this current trauma, the future for the club is bright." Players' January wages remained unpaid ahead of Southend's 25 February game at Torquay United, and were eventually paid 28 days late; other staff had not been paid since November. Less than 24 hours before the winding-up hearing, the club said it had paid the £1.4m tax bill, adding that "funds as working capital" had also been injected into the club. At a brief hearing at the Insolvency and Companies Court on 1 March 2023, the winding-up petition was dismissed after HMRC confirmed the debt had been paid. However, the transfer embargo remained in place; sponsors, angry at being kept in the dark, talked of taking legal action against the club; and supporters groups, fearing "the next crisis could be just around the corner", highlighted the "owner's inadequacies" and said a new beginning would only be possible "when a new structure and ownership is in place at the club". Two days later, defender Kacper Łopata, apparently unhappy at how players were treated over their unpaid wages, terminated his contract with the club.

Club put up for sale
On 17 March 2023, the club said Ron Martin and the board of directors had commenced a formal process to explore the sale of the club or to bring in new investment partners.

Stadium

The club has played its home games at five grounds: the original Roots Hall, the Kursaal, the Southend Stadium, the rented New Writtle Street Stadium (home of Chelmsford City) and again at Roots Hall.

Roots Hall was the first stadium that the club owned and was built on the site of their original home, albeit at a lower level. The site previous to Southend purchasing it in 1952 had been used as a sand quarry, by the council as a landfill site and by the local gas board (which was convinced to move to Progress Road). It took 10 years to fully complete the building of Roots Hall. The first game was played on 20 August 1955, a 3–1 Division Three (South) victory over Norwich City attendance 12,190, but the ground was far from complete. The main East Stand had barely been fitted and ran along only 50 yards of the touchline, and only a few steps of terracing encircled the ground, with the North, West and the huge South Bank still largely unconcreted. The North Stand had a single-barrelled roof which ran only the breadth of the penalty area, and the West Bank was covered at its rear only by a similar structure.

Although the ground was unfinished, during the inaugural season this was the least of the club's worries, for the pitch at Roots Hall showed the consequences of having been laid on top of thousands of tonnes of compacted rubbish. Drainage was a problem, and the wet winter turned the ground into a quagmire. The pitch was completely re-laid in the summer of 1956 and a proper drainage system, which is still in place, was constructed, and the West Bank roof was extended to reach the touchline, creating a unique double-barrelled structure.

The terracing was completed soon after, but the task of completely terracing all 72 steps of the South Bank was not completed until 1964. The North Bank roof was extended in the early 1960s, and the East Stand was extended to run the full length of the pitch in 1966. Floodlights were also installed during this period. Roots Hall was designed to hold 35,000 spectators, with over 15,000 on the South Bank alone, but the highest recorded attendance at the ground is 31,090 for an FA Cup third round tie with Liverpool in January 1979.

Until 1988 Roots Hall was still the newest ground in the Football League, but then the ground saw a significant change. United had hit bad times in the mid-1980s and new chairman Vic Jobson sold virtually all of the South Bank for development, leaving just a tiny block of 15 steps. In 1994, seats were installed onto the original terracing, and a second tier was added. The West Bank had already become seated in 1992 upon United's elevation to Division Two while the East Stand paddock also received a new seating deck, bolted and elevated from the terracing below. In 1995 the Gilbert & Rose West Stand roof was extended to meet up with the North and South Stands, with seating installed in each corner, thus giving the Roots Hall its current form, with a capacity of just under 12,500.

On 24 January 2007, Southend Borough Council unanimously agreed to give planning permission for a new 22,000-seater stadium at the proposed Fossetts Farm site, with Rochford District Council following suit 24 hours later. The application was subsequently submitted to Ruth Kelly, then Secretary of State for Communities and Local Government, for government approval. However, the application was "called in" at the beginning of April 2007. The inquiry began in September 2007, followed in October 2007 by a "final" inquiry, when chairman Ron Martin called for supporters to show in numbers at Southend's local government headquarters. On 6 March 2008, permission to develop Fossetts Farm was given by the government. However, it took a further 12 years before firm plans emerged for the development; in April 2020, a deal was agreed between Southend United, the borough council and social housing provider Citizen Housing. Plans were approved in October 2021, subject to Government approval anticipated in early 2022; the 22,000-capacity stadium would incorporate a 107-bed hotel and high-rise residential blocks of 182 homes on two corners.

In September 2022, after the club had been unable to get a hotel operator onboard, plans to build a hotel at the proposed new stadium were dropped in favour of 42 additional homes, taking the total to 224 homes. A revised planning application also outlined plans to lower the stadium capacity to 16,226 seats. In February 2023, applications for the additional homes and smaller stadium were both still to be decided by Southend Council as information had not been provided by the club.

Rivalries

Colchester United

The club has an intense local rivalry with fellow Essex side Colchester United, which extends back many years.

However, at the end of the 1989–90 season, Southend's promotion from the Football League Fourth Division coincided with Colchester's fall from the Football League, so the clubs had to wait almost 15 years before meeting again in competition in 2004, when they contested the Southern Final of the Football League Trophy; the Shrimpers won 4–3 on aggregate, securing their first ever appearance in a national cup final. In the following season, the two clubs met again in an Essex derby match in the same competition, with Southend emerging as the victors once again after a penalty shootout.

The two clubs were promoted from League One at the end of the 2005–06 season, after a long battle for top spot was eventually won by Southend. The overall competitive head-to-head record for the rivalry stands at 30 wins for Southend, 25 wins for Colchester, and 17 draws. The last meeting between Southend and Colchester came in October 2018, when Colchester won 2–0 in the group stage of the EFL Trophy.

Leyton Orient
There is also a fierce rivalry between Southend and Leyton Orient, which arises from the time between 1998 and 2005, when the Essex club were Orient's geographically-closest league rivals. Although the games between the two teams are eagerly anticipated, and Southend are considered to be Orient's main rivals, the Shrimpers see the London club as secondary rivals to Colchester United, for geographical and historical reasons.

The Shrimpers beat the O's in the 2012–13 Football League Trophy Southern Area Final to book a place at Wembley in the final against Crewe Alexandra. Southend won 1–0 at Brisbane Road in the first leg of the area final and drew 2–2 at Roots Hall in the second leg, winning 3–2 on aggregate, despite being in a lower division than Orient at the time.

Dagenham &  Redbridge 
Since Southend's relegation to the National League, a rivalry with Dagenham & Redbridge F.C. has developed, although largely only recognised by the London club.

Players

Current squad

B squad

Player of the Year

Top league scorer

Managers 

Source:

Management

Academy staff 
Academy manager: Mark Paterson 

Academy operations secretary/U21s secretary: Vacant

Professional development phase coach: Danny Heath

Lead youth development phase coach: Oisín Seager

Lead foundation phase coach: Tom Bailey

Education and welfare officer: Elaine Hume

Academy lead physiotherapist: Vacant

Under 21 strength and conditioning coach: Jon Rossi

Under 18 strength and conditioning coach: Vacant

Club honours

League 
League One/Third Division (Tier 3)
Champions (1): 2005–06
Runners-up: 1990–91
League Two/Fourth Division (Tier 4)
Champions (1): 1980–81
Runners-up: 1971–72, 1977–78
Third-place promotion: 1986–87
Play-off Winners: 2004–05, 2014–15
Southern League Second Division 
Winners (2): 1906–07, 1907–08
Runners-up: 1912–13

Cups 
Football League Trophy
Runners-up: 2003–04, 2004–05, 2012–13
Essex Professional Cup
Winners (10): 1950, 1953, 1954, 1955, 1957, 1962, 1965, 1967, 1972, 1973
Essex Senior Cup
Winners (3): 1983, 1991, 1997, 2008
Essex Thameside Trophy
Winners: 1990

Club records
Biggest victory as a league club: 10–1 v Golders Green, FA Cup, 1934–35; 10–1 v Brentwood, FA Cup, 1968–69; 10–1 v Aldershot, Football League Trophy, 1990–91
Heaviest defeat as a league club: 1–9 v Brighton & Hove Albion, 1965–66
Highest attendance (all Comps): 31,033 v Liverpool, FA Cup, 10 January 1979
Highest attendance (League): 21,020 v Leyton Orient, Football League Third Division South, 9 September 1955
Lowest attendance (all Comps): 641 v Brighton and Hove Albion U23s, EFL Trophy, 1 October 2019
Highest average attendance: 12,089 1949–50 Football League Third Division South – Southend Stadium
Lowest average attendance: 2,103 1984–85 Football League Fourth Division – Roots Hall
Most points in a season: 85 1990–91 Football League Third Division
Fewest points in a season: 19 2019-20, EFL League One (season shortened due to COVID-19 pandemic)
Most appearances (all Comps): Alan Moody (506 – 1972–1984)
Most appearances (League): Sandy Anderson (452 – 1950–1962)
Most appearances (FA Cup): Alan Moody (32 – 1972–1984)
Most appearances (League Cup): David Martin (25 – 1986–1993)
Most appearances (other cup): Kevin Maher (26 – 1998 to 2008)
Most appearances (single season): Sean Clohessy (59 – 2012–2013)
Most goals (all Comps): Roy Hollis (135 – 1954–1960)
Most goals (League): Roy Hollis (120 – 1954–1960)
Most goals (FA Cup): Roy Hollis (15 – 1954–1960) and Billy Best (15 – 1968–1973)
Most goals (League Cup): Sammy McMillan (15 – 1967–69) and David Martin (15 – 1986–1993)
Most goals (other cup): Brett Angell (10 – 1990–1994)
Consecutive wins (League): 8 (29 August 2005 – 9 October 2005)
Consecutive clean sheets (League): 8 (21 March 2015 – 25 April 2015)

Kit
Source:

References

External links

The Shrimpers Trust
SUFC DataBase – Shrimper's statistics

 
Football clubs in Essex
Association football clubs established in 1906
Former English Football League clubs
National League (English football) clubs
Southern Football League clubs
1906 establishments in England
Football clubs in England
Buildings and structures in Southend-on-Sea
Sports clubs in Southend-on-Sea
South Essex League